Petrovskoye is a rural locality (a village) in Spasskoye Rural Settlement, Vologodsky District, Vologda Oblast, Russia. The population was 3 as of 2002. There are 10 streets.

Geography 
Petrovskoye is located 7 km south of Vologda (the district's administrative centre) by road. Maryukhino is the nearest rural locality.

References 

Rural localities in Vologodsky District